John Maxwell Coetzee OMG (born 9 February 1940) is a South African–Australian novelist, essayist, linguist, translator and recipient of the 2003 Nobel Prize in Literature.  He is one of the most critically acclaimed and decorated authors in the English language. He has won the Booker Prize (twice), the CNA Prize (thrice), the Jerusalem Prize, the Prix Femina étranger, and The Irish Times International Fiction Prize, and holds a number of other awards and honorary doctorates.

Coetzee moved to Australia in 2002 and became an Australian citizen in 2006. He lives in Adelaide.

Life and career

Early life (Boyhood)
Coetzee was born in Cape Town, Cape Province, Union of South Africa, on 9 February 1940 to Afrikaner parents. His father, Zacharias Coetzee (1912–1988), was an occasional attorney and government employee, and his mother, Vera Coetzee (née Wehmeyer; 1904–1986), a schoolteacher. The family mainly spoke English at home, but John spoke Afrikaans with other relatives. He is descended from 17th-century Dutch immigrants to South Africa on his father's side, and from Dutch, German and Polish immigrants through his mother.

Coetzee spent most of his early life in Cape Town and in Worcester, a town in the Cape Province (modern-day Western Cape), as recounted in his fictionalised memoir, Boyhood (1997). His family moved to Worcester when he was eight, after his father lost his government job. He attended St. Joseph's College, a Catholic school in the Cape Town suburb Rondebosch, later studying mathematics and English at the University of Cape Town and receiving his Bachelor of Arts with honours in English in 1960 and his Bachelor of Arts with honours in mathematics in 1961.

London (Youth)
Coetzee moved to the United Kingdom in 1962 and worked as a computer programmer for IBM in London and ICT (International Computers and Tabulators) in Bracknell, staying until 1965. In 1963, the University of Cape Town awarded him a Master of Arts degree for his thesis "The Works of Ford Madox Ford with Particular Reference to the Novels" (1963). Coetzee's experiences in England were later recounted in Youth (2002), his second volume of fictionalised memoirs.

Academia

United States
In 1965 Coetzee went to the University of Texas at Austin, in the United States, on the Fulbright Program, receiving his doctorate in 1969. His PhD dissertation was a computer-aided stylistic analysis of Samuel Beckett's English prose. In 1968, Coetzee began teaching English literature at the State University of New York at Buffalo, where he stayed until 1971. At Buffalo he began his first novel, Dusklands.

From as early as 1968 Coetzee sought permanent residence in the U.S., a process that was finally unsuccessful, in part due to his involvement in protests against the war in Vietnam. In March 1970, he was one of 45 faculty members who occupied the university's Hayes Hall and were arrested for criminal trespass. The charges against them were dropped in 1971.

University of Cape Town
In 1972 Coetzee returned to South Africa and was appointed lecturer in the Department of English Language and Literature at the University of Cape Town. He was promoted to senior lecturer and associate professor before becoming Professor of General Literature in 1984. In 1994 Coetzee became Arderne Professor in English, and in 1999 he was appointed Distinguished Professor in the Faculty of Humanities. Upon retirement in 2002, he was awarded emeritus status. He served on the Committee on Social Thought at the University of Chicago until 2003.

Adelaide
After relocating to Adelaide, Australia, Coetzee was made an honorary research fellow at the English Department of the University of Adelaide, where his partner, Dorothy Driver, is a fellow academic. , Coetzee is listed as Professor of Literature within English and Creative Writing at the school, and Driver as Visiting Research Fellow.

Awards, recognition, appearances
Coetzee has received numerous awards throughout his career, although he has a reputation for avoiding award ceremonies.

1983 and 1999 Booker Prizes
Coetzee was the first writer to be awarded the Booker Prize twice: for Life & Times of Michael K in 1983, and for Disgrace in 1999. , four other authors have achieved this, J.G. Farrell, Peter Carey, Hilary Mantel, and Margaret Atwood.

Summertime, named on the 2009 longlist, was an early favourite to win Coetzee an unprecedented third Booker Prize. It made the shortlist, but lost to bookmakers' favourite Wolf Hall, by Mantel. Coetzee was also longlisted in 2003 for Elizabeth Costello and in 2005 for Slow Man.

The Schooldays of Jesus, a follow up to his 2013 novel The Childhood of Jesus, was longlisted for the 2016 Booker Prize.

2003 Nobel Prize in Literature
On 2 October 2003, Horace Engdahl, head of the Swedish Academy, announced that Coetzee had been chosen as that year's recipient of the Nobel Prize in Literature, making him the fourth African writer to be so honoured and the second South African, after Nadine Gordimer. When awarding the prize, the Swedish Academy stated that Coetzee "in innumerable guises portrays the surprising involvement of the outsider". The press release for the award also cited his "well-crafted composition, pregnant dialogue and analytical brilliance", while focusing on the moral nature of his work. The prize ceremony was held in Stockholm on 10 December 2003.

Other awards and recognition
Coetzee is a three-time winner of South Africa's CNA Prize. His Waiting for the Barbarians received both the James Tait Black Memorial Prize and the Geoffrey Faber Memorial Prize, Age of Iron was awarded the Sunday Express Book of the Year award, and The Master of Petersburg was awarded The Irish Times International Fiction Prize in 1995. He has also won the French Prix Femina étranger and two Commonwealth Writers' Prizes for the African region, for Master of St Petersburg in 1995 and for Disgrace in 2000 (the latter personally presented by Queen Elizabeth II at Buckingham Palace), and the 1987 Jerusalem Prize for the Freedom of the Individual in Society. In 1998 Coetzee received the Lannan Literary Award for Fiction.

On 27 September 2005 The South African government awarded Coetzee the Order of Mapungubwe (gold class) for his "exceptional contribution in the field of literature and for putting South Africa on the world stage." In 2006, he was elected to the American Philosophical Society. He holds honorary doctorates from The American University of Paris, the University of Adelaide, La Trobe University, the University of Natal, the University of Oxford, Rhodes University, the State University of New York at Buffalo, the University of Strathclyde, the University of Technology, Sydney, the Adam Mickiewicz University in Poznań and the Universidad Iberoamericana.

In 2013, Richard Poplak of the Daily Maverick described Coetzee as "inarguably the most celebrated and decorated living English-language author".

Adelaide
In 2004, the Lord Mayor of Adelaide handed Coetzee the keys to the city.

In 2010, Coetzee was made an international ambassador for Adelaide Writers' Week, along with American novelist Susanna Moore and English poet Michael Hulse.

Coetzee is patron of the J.M. Coetzee Centre for Creative Practice (JMCCCP), a research centre and cultural hub. The centre runs workshops with the aim of providing "a stimulating environment for emerging and established writers, scholars and musicians". Coetzee's work provides particular inspiration to encourage engagement with social and political issues, as well as music. The centre was established in 2015.

In November 2014, Coetzee was honoured with a three-day academic conference, "JM Coetzee in the World", in Adelaide. It was called "the culmination of an enormous collaborative effort and the first event of its kind in Australia" and "a reflection of the deep esteem in which John Coetzee is held by Australian academia".

Writers' Week
Coetzee first visited Adelaide in 1996 when he was invited to appear at Adelaide Writers' Week. He subsequently made appearances at the literary festival in 2004, 2010 (when he introduced Geoff Dyer) and 2019 (when he introduced Marlene van Niekerk).

Views

South Africa
According to Fred Pfeil, Coetzee, André Brink and Breyten Breytenbach were at "the forefront of the anti-apartheid movement within Afrikaner literature and letters". On accepting the Jerusalem Prize in 1987, Coetzee spoke of the limitations of art in South African society, whose structures had resulted in "deformed and stunted relations between human beings" and "a deformed and stunted inner life". He added, "South African literature is a literature in bondage. It is a less than fully human literature. It is exactly the kind of literature you would expect people to write from prison", and called on the South African government to abandon its apartheid policy. The scholar Isidore Diala wrote that Coetzee, Nadine Gordimer, and Brink are "three of South Africa's most distinguished white writers, all with definite anti-apartheid commitment".

It has been argued that Coetzee's 1999 novel Disgrace allegorises South Africa's Truth and Reconciliation Commission. Asked about his views on the TRC, Coetzee said, "In a state with no official religion, the TRC was somewhat anomalous: a court of a certain kind based to a large degree on Christian teaching and on a strand of Christian teaching accepted in their hearts by only a tiny proportion of the citizenry. Only the future will tell what the TRC managed to achieve".

After his Australian citizenship ceremony, Coetzee said, "I did not so much leave South Africa, a country with which I retain strong emotional ties, but come to Australia. I came because from the time of my first visit in 1991, I was attracted by the free and generous spirit of the people, by the beauty of the land itself and—when I first saw Adelaide—by the grace of the city that I now have the honour of calling my home." When he moved to Australia, Coetzee cited the South African government's lax attitude to crime in that country as a reason, leading to a spat with Thabo Mbeki, who said, "South Africa is not only a place of rape", referencing Coetzee's Disgrace. In 1999, the African National Congress's submission to a South African Human Rights Commission investigation into racism in the media said that Disgrace depicted racist stereotypes. But when Coetzee won the Nobel Prize, Mbeki congratulated him "on behalf of the South African nation and indeed the continent of Africa".

Politics
Coetzee has never specified any political orientation, though has alluded to politics in his work. Writing about his past in the third person, Coetzee wrote in Doubling the Point:

Asked about the latter part of this quote in an interview, Coetzee answered, "There is no longer a left worth speaking of, and a language of the left. The language of politics, with its new economistic bent, is even more repellent than it was 15 years ago".

In February 2016, Coetzee was one of 61 signatories to a letter to Australian prime minister Malcolm Turnbull and immigration minister Peter Dutton condemning their government's policy of offshore detention of asylum seekers.

Law
In 2005, Coetzee criticised contemporary anti-terrorism laws as resembling those of South Africa's apartheid regime: "I used to think that the people who created [South Africa's] laws that effectively suspended the rule of law were moral barbarians. Now I know they were just pioneers ahead of their time". The main character in Coetzee's 2007 Diary of a Bad Year, which has been described as blending "memoir with fiction, academic criticism with novelistic narration" and refusing "to recognize the border that has traditionally separated political theory from fictional narrative", shares similar concerns about the policies of John Howard and George W. Bush.

Animals
In recent years, Coetzee has become a vocal critic of cruelty to animals and an advocate of animal rights. In a speech given on his behalf by Hugo Weaving in Sydney on 22 February 2007, Coetzee railed against the modern animal husbandry industry. The speech was for Voiceless, the animal protection institute, an Australian nonprofit animal protection organization of which Coetzee became a patron in 2004. Coetzee's fiction has similarly engaged with animal cruelty and animal welfare, especially The Lives of Animals, Disgrace, Elizabeth Costello, and The Old Woman and the Cats. He is a vegetarian.

In 2008, at the behest of John Banville, who alerted him to the matter, Coetzee wrote to The Irish Times of his opposition to Trinity College Dublin's use of vivisection on animals for scientific research. He wrote: "I support the sentiments expressed by John Banville. There is no good reason—in fact there has never been any good reason, scientific or pedagogical—to require students to cut up living animals. Trinity College brings shame on itself by continuing with the practice." Nearly nine years later, when TCD's continued (and, indeed, increasing) practice of vivisection featured in the news, a listener to the RTÉ Radio 1 weekday afternoon show Liveline pointed out that Banville had previously raised the matter but been ignored. Banville then telephoned Liveline to call the practice "absolutely disgraceful" and recalled how his and Coetzee's efforts to intervene had been to no avail: "I was passing by the front gates of Trinity one day and there was a group of mostly young women protesting and I was interested. I went over and I spoke to them and they said that vivisection experiments were being carried out in the college. This was a great surprise to me and a great shock, so I wrote a letter of protest to The Irish Times. Some lady professor from Trinity wrote back essentially saying Mr. Banville should stick to his books and leave us scientists to our valuable work." Asked if he received any other support for his stance in the letter he sent to The Irish Times, Banville replied, "No. I became entirely dispirited and I thought, 'Just shut up, John. Stay out of it because I'm not going to do any good'. If I had done any good I would have kept it on. I mean, I got John Coetzee—you know, the famous novelist J. M. Coetzee—I got him to write a letter to The Irish Times. I asked a lot of people."

Coetzee wanted to be a candidate in the 2014 European Parliament election for the Dutch Party for the Animals, but the Dutch election board rejected his candidacy, arguing that candidates had to prove legal residence in the European Union.

The South
From 2015 to 2018, Coetzee was a director of a seminar on the Literatures of the South at the Universidad Nacional de San Martín. This involved writers and literary figures from Southern Africa, Australia, New Zealand, and South America. The aim of the seminars, one observer remarked, was "to develop comparative perspectives on the literature" and journalism of the three areas, "to establish new intellectual networks, and to build a corpus of translated works from across the South through collaborative publishing ventures." At the same time he was involved in a research project in Australia, Other Worlds: Forms of World Literature, for which he led a theme on "Everyday Pleasures" that is also focused on the literatures of the South. Coetzee chose to publish The Schooldays of Jesus, The Death of Jesus and The Pole in Australia and Argentina before they were published in the U.K. or the U.S. In an interview with El Pais, he said, "the symbolism of publishing in the South before the North is important to me."

Copyright/piracy
When asked in 2015 to address unofficial Iranian translations of foreign works—Iran does not recognize international copyright agreements—Coetzee stated his disapproval of the practice on moral grounds and wished to have it sent to journalistic organisations in that country.

Personal life

Public image
Coetzee is known to be reclusive, avoiding publicity to such an extent that he did not collect either of his two Booker Prizes in person. The South African writer Rian Malan has said:

Asked about this comment in an email interview, Coetzee replied, "I have met Rian Malan only once in my life. He does not know me and is not qualified to talk about my character."

Because of his reclusiveness, signed copies of Coetzee's fiction are highly prized. Recognising this, he was a key figure in the establishment of Oak Tree Press's First Chapter Series, which produces limited-edition signed works by literary greats to raise money for the child victims and orphans of the African HIV/AIDS crisis.

Family and personal life
Coetzee married Philippa Jubber in 1963. They divorced in 1980. They had a son, Nicolas (born 1966), and a daughter, Gisela (born 1968). Nicolas died in 1989 at the age of 23 after accidentally falling from the balcony of his Johannesburg apartment.

On 6 March 2006, Coetzee became an Australian citizen, and it has been argued that his "acquired 'Australianness' is deliberately adopted and stressed" by Australians.

Coetzee's younger brother, the journalist David Coetzee, died in 2010.

His partner, Dorothy Driver, is an academic at the University of Adelaide.

Works 

Coetzee's first novel was Dusklands (1974) and he has continued to publish a novel about every three years. He has also written autobiographical novels, short fiction, translations from Dutch and Afrikaans, and numerous essays and works of criticism.

Novels 

 Dusklands (1974) 
 In the Heart of the Country (1977) 
 Waiting for the Barbarians (1980) 
 Life & Times of Michael K (1983) 
 Foe (1986) 
 Age of Iron (1990) 
 The Master of Petersburg (1994) 
 Disgrace (1999) 
 Elizabeth Costello (2003) 
 Slow Man (2005) 
 Diary of a Bad Year (2007) 
 The Childhood of Jesus (2013) 
 The Schooldays of Jesus (2016) 
 The Death of Jesus (2019) 
 The Pole (2023)

Autobiographical novels 

 Boyhood: Scenes from Provincial Life (1997) 
 Youth: Scenes from Provincial Life II (2002) 
 Summertime (2009) 
 Scenes from Provincial Life (2011) . An edited single volume of Boyhood: Scenes from Provincial Life, Youth: Scenes from Provincial Life II, and Summertime.

Short fiction 

 The Lives of Animals (Princeton, NJ: Princeton University Press, 1999) 
 Three Stories (Melbourne: Text Publishing, 2014) 
 Siete cuentos morales (Barcelona: El Hilo de Ariadna/Literatura Random House, 2018)

See also 
 List of African writers
 List of animal rights advocates
 List of vegetarians

Notes

References

Further reading

About Coetzee's work
J. M. Coetzee at The New York Times - New York Times reviews of Coetzee's novels
 J. M. Coetzee: An Inventory of His Papers at the Harry Ransom Center (at the University of Texas at Austin) 
 J. M. Coetzee's page as a member of the Australian Research Council project, 'Other Worlds: Forms of World Literature'

Nobel Prize (2003)
 
 
 J. M. Coetzee at the Nobel Prize Internet Archive

By Coetzee
 - Book review of No Friend But the Mountains by Behrouz Boochani (and other commentary relating to the Australian government's treatment of asylum seekers) 
  
 
 The Lives of Animals, delivered for The Tanner Lectures on Human Values, Princeton, 1997
 "A Word from J. M. Coetzee", address read by Hugo Weaving at the opening of the exhibition "Voiceless: I Feel Therefore I Am" by Voiceless: The Animal Protection Institute, 22 February 2007, Sherman Galleries, Sydney, Australia

External links

 
1940 births
Living people
20th-century Australian male writers
20th-century Australian novelists
20th-century South African male writers
20th-century South African novelists
20th-century translators
21st-century Australian male writers
21st-century Australian novelists
21st-century South African male writers
21st-century South African novelists
21st-century translators
Afrikaner anti-apartheid activists
Afrikaner people
Animal rights scholars
Australian atheists
Australian essayists
Australian male novelists
Australian Nobel laureates
Australian opera librettists
Australian people of Dutch descent
Australian people of German descent
Australian people of Polish descent
Booker Prize winners
Fellows of the Royal Society of Literature
IBM employees
James Tait Black Memorial Prize recipients
Jerusalem Prize recipients
21st-century linguists
Naturalised citizens of Australia
Nobel laureates in Literature
Postmodern writers
Prix Femina Étranger winners
South African atheists
South African emigrants to Australia
South African expatriates in the United States
South African male novelists
South African Nobel laureates
South African people of Dutch descent
South African people of German descent
South African people of Polish descent
South African translators
State University of New York faculty
The New Yorker people
Afrikaans–English translators
Dutch–English translators
University at Buffalo faculty
Academic staff of the University of Cape Town
University of Cape Town alumni
University of Chicago faculty
University of Texas at Austin alumni
Writers from Cape Town
Recipients of the Delmira Agustini Medal
Members of the American Philosophical Society
Fulbright alumni
Linguists from South Africa
Linguists from Australia